Microschismus fortis is a species of moth of the family Alucitidae. It is known from South Africa.

References

Ustjuzhanin & Kovtunovich, 2011. A revision of the genus Microschismus Fletcher, 1909 (Lepidoptera: Alucitidae).African Invertebrates;2011, Vol. 52 Issue 2, p557 (abstract)

Endemic moths of South Africa
Alucitidae
Moths of Africa
Moths described in 1881